Hot Tub Time Machine 2 is a 2015 American science-fiction comedy film directed by Steve Pink and written by Josh Heald. The film stars Rob Corddry, Craig Robinson, Clark Duke, Adam Scott, Chevy Chase, and Gillian Jacobs. It is the sequel to the 2010 film Hot Tub Time Machine. In the film, After their first adventure with the "Hot Tub Time Machine," Lou (Rob Corddry) and Nick (Craig Robinson) are living very well off their ill-gotten gains, while Jacob (Clark Duke) still cannot rely on Lou to be a positive role model. When an unknown assailant breaks into Lou's mansion and shoots him, Nick and Jacob take him for another trip in the hot tub. They emerge in the year 2025, where they must figure out who shot Lou and prevent it from happening again.

The film was released on February 20, 2015. John Cusack, who played Adam Yates and produced the first film, does not return in the theatrical cut, but has a brief cameo in the unrated version. The film grossed $13 million against a budget of $18 million, and was heavily panned by critics, who deemed it "unfunny" and "unoriginal".

Plot
Five years after the events of the first film, Lou Dorchen and Nick Webber have become rich and famous, with Lou becoming a billionaire and Nick being a successful musician/singer. At Lou's celebratory party, Lou is shot in the groin. Jacob (Lou's son) and Nick drag him to the hot tub time machine and activate it to travel back in time to find and stop the killer. When they awaken, they find themselves 10 years in the future, where Jacob is in charge of Lou's mansion. After determining that they are in an alternate timeline where Lou's killer is from this future, they go to their friend Adam Yates's home, only to meet his son Adam Yates Stedmeyer (Adam Jr.), who is engaged to a woman named Jill.

Lou suspects his nemesis Gary Winkle is the killer, but he learns Gary actually made his own fortune from some land that Lou could have purchased. They party at Gary's nightclub, where Adam Jr. takes hallucinogens for the first time. The next day, they attend the popular television game show Choozy Doozy, where contestant Nick is required to have virtual reality sex with a man. As Lou suggested the idea, he is obliged to participate, but uses his "lifeline" to switch with Adam Jr. Jacob becomes disillusioned with the misadventures and leaves the group to get drunk at Gary's club and to then commit suicide by jumping off an extremely high building. Lou makes amends with him and prevents his suicide.

When the guys see a news report where Brad, an employee of Lougle, invents nitrotrinadium, the ingredient that activates the hot tub time machine, they suspect he is the killer. At Adam Jr.'s wedding, Jacob talks with Brad and realizes he is not the killer, but that he invented the chemical after being inspired by Lou's words. Jill, who is upset about Adam Jr.'s partying, has sex with Lou, but when Adam Jr. finds out, he steals the nitrotrinadium and goes back to the past. Jacob, Nick, and Lou return to the mansion, but are too late to stop Adam Jr. As the guys sit in defeat, Jacob realizes that because the chemical has appeared in the past, it now exists in the future. They return to the present and stop Adam Jr. from shooting Lou after Lou apologizes to him.

Following this incident, Nick apologizes to Courtney as Lou tells his wife he wants to go to drug rehabilitation for his drug abuse. Adam Jr. meets Jill for the first time. The more optimistic Jacob approaches Sophie (his girlfriend in the future) and convinces her to join him in a relationship. As Lou, Nick, Jacob, and Adam Jr. return to the hot tub, Lou's head is shot off by Lou (or Adam Sr. in the unrated version) dressed in a minuteman costume. Patriot Lou informs them there are multiple Lous anyway, and invites them to "make America happen." During the closing credits, the guys are seen exploiting the time machine to change history.

Cast

 Rob Corddry as Lou Dorchen
 Craig Robinson as Nick Webber
 Clark Duke as Jacob Dorchen
 Adam Scott as Adam Yates Stedmeyer (Adam Jr.)

 Chevy Chase as Hot Tub Repairman
 Gillian Jacobs as Jill

 Collette Wolfe as Kelly Dorchen
 Bianca Haase as Sophie

 Jason P. Jones as Gary Winkle
 Kellee Stewart as Courtney Webber 
 Kumail Nanjiani as Brad

 Josh Heald as Terry
 Gretchen Koerner as Susan
 Lisa Loeb as herself
 Jessica Williams as herself
 Bruce Buffer as himself

John Cusack, who played Adam Yates in Hot Tub Time Machine (2010), has an uncredited cameo appearance in the unrated version. Christian Slater also has an uncredited cameo role as Choozy Doozy host Brett McShaussey.

Production
Principal photography began in New Orleans on June 5, 2013. On January 31, 2014, it was announced that the film would be released on December 25, 2014. On October 14, 2014, the film's release date was pushed back to February 20, 2015.

Release
Hot Tub Time Machine 2 grossed $6 million on its opening weekend, finishing 7th at the box office.

The film grossed a total of $13.1 million, against a $14–18 million budget, which was less than the opening weekend of the first film.

Reception
Unlike its predecessor, Hot Tub Time Machine 2 was a massive critical failure. The website's critical consensus reads, "A shallow dip overflowing with juvenile humor, Hot Tub Time Machine 2 is a lukewarm sequel that's healthiest to avoid." Metacritic gives it a score of 29 out of 100 based on reviews from 31 critics, indicating "generally unfavorable reviews". Audiences surveyed by CinemaScore, gave the film a grade of "C−" on an F to A+ scale.

Reviews were generally negative, with The Hollywood Reporter calling it a "flop-sweaty cash grab that gives a bad name to sequels in which key talent has jumped ship." Jordon Hoffman hated the film so much he said it tainted the memory of the first film.

Justin Chang of Variety gave it a positive review. He called it "Boorish and crass, homophobic and misogynistic, the very definition of sloppy seconds" which he found typical of the genre but was surprised "That it somehow manages to send you out of the theater feeling tickled rather than sullied".

GLAAD singled out the film for its "outright offensive depictions of LGBT people" and defamatory homophobic humor.

Accolades
The movie resulted in two nominations at the Golden Raspberry Award.
Chevy Chase was nominated as Worst Supporting Actor,
and the movie was nominated as Worst Prequel, Remake, Rip-off or Sequel.

Home video
Hot Tub Time Machine 2 was released on DVD and Blu-ray on May 19, 2015 with a "Hotter and Wetter Unrated Cut" on the Blu-ray that includes additional scenes including a cameo from John Cusack that was cut from the film's theatrical edition.

References

External links
 
 
 
 

2015 films
2010s science fiction comedy films
American science fiction comedy films
American sequel films
Films scored by Christophe Beck
Films set in New Orleans
Films set in 2015
Films set in 2025
Films shot in New Orleans
Films about time travel
Metro-Goldwyn-Mayer films
Paramount Pictures films
Films directed by Steve Pink
2015 comedy films
2010s English-language films
2010s American films